The 1985 Transamerica Open, also known as the Pacific Coast Championships, was a men's tennis tournament played on indoor carpet courts at the Cow Palace in San Francisco, California in the United States. The event was part of the 1985 Nabisco Grand Prix circuit. It was the 97th edition of the tournament and was held from September 23 through September 29, 1985. Third-seeded Stefan Edberg won the singles title.

Finals

Singles
 Stefan Edberg defeated  Johan Kriek 6–4, 6–2
 It was Edberg's 2nd singles title of the year and the 3rd of his career.

Doubles
 Paul Annacone /  Christo van Rensburg defeated  Brad Gilbert /  Sandy Mayer 3–6, 6–3, 6–4

References

External links
 ITF tournament edition details

Transamerica Open
Pacific Coast International Open
Transamerica Open
Transamerica Open
Transamerica Open